The South Tower is a 38-story,  skyscraper constructed between 1962 and 1967 in Brussels, Belgium. The tower is the tallest building in Belgium, and was the tallest in the European Economic Community (EEC) when it was built until it was surpassed by Tour Montparnasse in Paris in 1972. 

The Tour du Midi stands adjacent to Brussels-South railway station. The building's facade was reclad in 1995–96 with unitised glass panels using double glass solarbel silver, and it can accommodate about 2,500 office workers. It was built for the Belgian Federal Pensions Service (FPS), which still occupies it today.

References

Buildings and structures in Brussels
Skyscraper office buildings in Belgium
Saint-Gilles, Belgium
Commercial buildings completed in 1967